James Cocks may refer to:
James Cocks (died 1750), MP for Reigate
James Cocks (1773–1854), MP for Reigate
James Somers Cocks (1790–1856), MP for Reigate